Unplug It In is an acoustic EP by Eddie Money, released in 1992.  Tracks were recorded live during the "Unplugged Tour" at The Back Alley in Houston, Texas, and Backroom in Austin, Texas.

Track listing
 "Gimme Some Water" – 3:38
 "She Takes My Breath Away" – 3:47
 "Save a Little Room in Your Heart for Me" – 4:26
 "You've Really Got a Hold On Me" (Smokey Robinson & The Miracles cover) – 4:18
 "Two Tickets To Paradise" – 3:34
 "Trinidad" – 4:45
 "Fall in Love Again" – 4:21

Personnel
Eddie Money - Vocals
Tommy Girvin - Guitar
Monty Byrom - Guitars, vocals
Brian Gary - Piano, Organ
John Snider Jr. - Drums and Percussion
Don Schiff - Bass

Notes 

Eddie Money albums
1992 EPs
Columbia Records EPs